The browser-based IndustryMasters product is a range of business simulation games that allows students, business people and others to sharpen their entrepreneurial and strategic management skills by building their own company and competing in real-time against each other
    
IndustryMasters is available in several editions, which are customized for usage either in corporate learning, in MBA programs, colleges or for training people without a business background. Participants can play individually or with a team to develop a strategy, undertake an entrepreneurial start-up and compete with each other in a real-time multi-player competition.

The IndustryPlayer Legacy:
IndustryPlayer was the forerunner of the webserver-based version IndustryMasters - both business simulation games, -multiplayer on-line business strategy games based on a simulation of real world economy, originally developed by Tycoon Sistemas Limitada of Brazil. Tycoon Sistemas Ltda and Tycoon Systems Inc were eventually succeeded by IndustryMasters Limited.

IndustryPlayer participants took the role of an entrepreneur and competed with each other in real-time for market leadership and shareholder value. The game allowed university students, business professionals and others to attempt to engineer a successful corporate environment. Participants could log into the Web-based tool to play individually or in groups and get an evaluation of their performance.

The game included a real-time corporate accounting system, industry analysis tools, and scoring and debriefing features.

IndustryPlayer Classic, the download version for use with Windows, simulated aspects of entrepreneurship: from strategy, investment and finance to the interactions with competitors, workforce, consumers, banks and the environment (CSR, Carbon Footprint).

"Serious games can be powerful educational tools, allowing users to experiment, learn from their mistakes and safely experience risky or dangerous situations.... Examples of serious games include IndustryPlayer, a business simulation based on real-world data ..."

IndustryMasters and Tycoon Systems Ltd have been selected for the past five years (2006–2010) to run "Mousetrap" a major IIMA Confluence Event run at the Indian Institute of Management, Ahmedabad (IIMA). The annual "Mousetrap" competition uses the IndustryMasters game to allow 1,800 students in 600 teams of 3 people compete for virtual market dominance.

Notes

External links
IndustryMasters website

2007 video games
Business simulation games
Video games developed in Germany
Windows games
Windows-only games
Strategy video games